Brautnuten Peak is a low peak  southeast of Snøkallen Hill, on the east side of Ahlmann Ridge in Queen Maud Land. It was mapped by Norwegian cartographers from surveys and air photos by the Norwegian–British–Swedish Antarctic Expedition (1949–52) and from air photos by the Norwegian expedition (1958–59) and named by the Norwegians.

References 

Mountains of Queen Maud Land
Princess Martha Coast